Mahi Binebine is a Moroccan painter and novelist born in Marrakech in 1959. Binebine has written six novels which have been translated into various languages.

Career

Born in 1959 in Marrakech, Mahi Binebine moved in Paris in 1980 to continue his studies in mathematics, which he taught for eight years. He then devoted himself to writing and painting. He wrote several novels, which have been translated into a dozen languages. He emigrated to New York from 1994 to 1999. His paintings are part of the permanent collection at the Guggenheim Museum in New York. He returned to Marrakech in 2002 where he currently lives and works.

In "Mamaya’s Last Journey" the author is drawing on an episode from his own family history. His brother Aziz was one of the young officers who had taken part in the failed military coup against King Hassan II in 1971. For 18 years, he was imprisoned in the desert camp of Tazmamart, under conditions of unimaginable and almost indescribable brutality. Of the 56 prisoners, only half survived; among them, Aziz Binebine. Mahi Binebine's fellow writer Tahar Ben Jelloun took this story as the basis for his novel This Blinding Absence of Light.

Welcome to Paradise, the English translation of Cannibales (by Lulu Norman) was short-listed for the Independent Foreign Fiction Prize in 2004. Horses of God, also translated by Lulu Norman (original: Les étoiles de Sidi Moumen), was shortlisted for the Best Translated Book Award in 2014. It was made into a feature film in Morocco in 2011, called Horses of God, directed by Nabil Ayouch and selected for the official Moroccan entry for best foreign language film for the 2013 Oscars.

In 2020, Mahi won the Mediterranean Prize for his novel "Rue du pardon".

Novels 
 Le sommeil de l'esclave, Ed. Stock 1992, 
 Les funérailles du lait, Ed. Stock 1994, 
 L'ombre du poète, Ed. Stock 1997, 
 Pollens, Ed. Fayard 2001, 
 Terre d'ombres brulée, 1997 Ed. Fayard, 
 Cannibales, Ed. Fayard 1999,  Ed. L'Aube,  (English Translation Welcome to Paradise)
 Le griot de Marrakech, 2005 Ed. L'Aube, 
 Les étoiles de Sidi Moumen,  Ed. Flammarion 2010  (English Translation "Horses of God", French Prix du roman arabe Movie by Nabil Ayouch, Les chevaux de Dieu English Translation Horses of God
 Le Seigneur vous le rendra, Ed. Flammarion 2013, 
 Le fou du Roi'', Ed. Stock 2017,

Exhibitions
2017  Galerie Abla Ababou , Rabat
Art Paris (Grand Palais)
Galerie DX
Rétrospective - Galerie Claude Lemand

2016  Musée MACMA, Marrakech.

2015  Insoumission
Forum international des droits de L'Homme,
Marrakech, Musée de la Palmeraie

2014  Musée de la Palmeraie, Marrakech

2013  Galerie Document 15, Paris

2012  Galerie 38, Casablanca
Galerie Benamou, Paris

2011  Galerie Caprice Horn, Berlin
Galerie Loft (Expo à six mains avec Mourabiti et Yamou),
Casablanca
2010 Galerie Atelier 21 (Casablanca) 
AAART Foundation, Kitzbühel, Autriche

2009 53ème Biennale de Venise Venice Biennale
AAART Foundation - Autriche
Galerie CMOOA, Rabat 
Galerie Delacroix, Tanger
2008  Galerie Atelier 21 - Casablanca
Galerie Violon Bleu - Londres
Galerie Navarra - 75 Faubourg, Paris
Galerie Loft, Paris
Galerie Bailly, Paris
Fondation FAAP, Sao Paolo
2007  Siège Société Générale, Casablanca
Galerie Nationale Bab Rouah, Rabat
Galerie Noir sur blanc, Marrakech
Palais des Congrès, Grasse (France)
Le Lazaret Olandini,  Ajaccio (Avec Yamou)

2006  Kasbah Agafay, Marrakech
Galerie Venise Cadre,  Casablanca
Galerie les Atlassides, Marrakech

2005  Galerie Venise-Cadre, Casablanca
Galerie Atlassides, Marrakech
Musée Archéologique de Silves (Portugal)
Eglise de la Miséricorde, Silves (Portugal)
Gemap, Casablanca

2004  Arte Invest,  Rome
Festival Arte Mare Bastia (corse)
Bellas Artes,  Madrid
Galerie Atalante,  Madrid
Galerie Brigitte Schenk, Köln

2003  Espace Actua, Casablanca (avec Yamou)
Galerie Bab el kebir, Rabat (avec Selfati)
Galerie AAM,  Rome
Studio Bocchi, Rome
Fundacione Maturen, Tarazona.
Galerie Baskoa, Barcelonne.
Kunst Köln, Galerie Brigitte Schenk

2002  Galerie Dahiez & Associés, Zurich
Galerie Brigitte Schenk, Köln
Musée de Marrakech
Société Générale Marocaine, Casablanca
Institut Cervantes, Tanger
Galerie Brigitte Schenk, Kunst Köln
Ministère de la culture, Abu Dhabi

2001  Tinglado 4 Moll de Costa, Taragone
Palais des congrès, Grasse.

2000  Espace Paul Ricard, Paris
Galerie El Manar, Casablanca

1999  Galerie Stendhal, New York
Galerie du Fleuve, Paris
Galerie Brigitte Shenk, Köln
1998  Galerie Ott, Düsseldorf
Museum of Contemporary Art, Washington D.C.

1997  Galerie Stendhal, New York.
1989  Contemporary French Art Gallery, New York
1988  Galerie la Découverte, Rabat
1987  Galerie de L'ONMT, Paris

References

External links 
 Bibliomonde  (retrieved on Feb. 11, 2009)
 Official website of Mahi Binebine 
 Qantara.de 
https://northafricapost.com/41558-moroccan-writer-mahi-binebine-wins-mediterranean-prize-2020.html

1959 births
Living people
People from Marrakesh
20th-century Moroccan painters
20th-century Moroccan writers
21st-century Moroccan painters
21st-century Moroccan writers
Moroccan male painters